John B. Busch Brewery Historic District is a historic brewery complex and national historic district located at Washington, Franklin County, Missouri. The complex developed between about 1855 and 1917.  It includes the main brewery complex and two ice houses (c. 1888, c. 1897).  The main brewery complex that is a multi-storied complex of buildings with five main sections. Much of the complex dates to 1888, with additions made in 1917.  The cellars date to about 1855.  The brewery closed in 1954.

It was listed on the National Register of Historic Places in 2000.

References

Historic districts on the National Register of Historic Places in Missouri
Industrial buildings and structures on the National Register of Historic Places in Missouri
Industrial buildings completed in 1855
Buildings and structures in Franklin County, Missouri
National Register of Historic Places in Franklin County, Missouri
Beer brewing companies based in Missouri
Anheuser-Busch